Nazul (also Romanized as Nāzūl) is a village in Samen Rural District, Samen District, Malayer County, Hamadan Province, Iran. At the 2014 census, its population was 355, in 125 families.

Almost everyone in this village has last name of " Torkashvand " and they speak Laki language. 

unlike the other villages, people from this village are not farmers and most of them are highly educated, there are many doctors, engineers, successful entrepreneurs and CEOs, University professors and faculties and some also have top positions at the government.

References 

Populated places in Malayer County